Scalesia gordilloi is a species of flowering plant in the family Asteraceae. It is endemic to the Galápagos Islands, where it is limited to a single location on San Cristóbal Island.

References

gordilloi
Endemic flora of Ecuador
Endangered plants
Plants described in 1986
Flora of the Galápagos Islands
Taxonomy articles created by Polbot